Stan Kenton! Tex Ritter! is an album by the Stan Kenton Orchestra with country music vocalist Tex Ritter performing country music compositions arranged in a big band style recorded and released by Capitol Records in 1962.

Reception

The Allmusic review by Bruce Eder noted "overall this wasn't the worst idea in the world. The public never bought it, however, and the album was quickly deleted".

Track listing
 "The Bandit of Brazil" (Alfredo Nascimento, Michael Carr, John Turner) – 2:23
 "The Green Leaves of Summer" (Dimitri Tiomkin, Paul Francis Webster) – 2:24
 "Home on the Range" (Traditional) – 3:18
 "Wagon Wheels" (Billy Hill, Peter DeRose) – 2:09
 "Empty Saddles" (Hill) – 2:36
 "High Noon (Do Not Forsake Me)" (Tiomkin, Ned Washington) – 2:42
 "Cool Water" (Bob Nolan) – 2:34
 "September Song" (Kurt Weill, Maxwell Anderson) – 3:57
 "Red River Valley" (Traditional) – 3:56
 "Cimarron (Roll On)" (Johnny Bond) – 3:20
 "Take Me Back to My Boots and Saddle" (Teddy Powell, Walter G. Samuels, Leonard Whitcup 2:45
 "The Last Round Up" (Hill) – 3:42 
Recorded at Capitol Studios in Hollywood, CA on March 26, 1962 (tracks 7 & 8), March 29, 1962 (tracks 2, 3, 5 & 9) and March 30, 1962 (tracks 1, 4, 6 & 10–12).

Personnel
Stan Kenton – piano, celeste, arranger, conductor (tracks 2, 3, 5 & 7–9)
Tex Ritter – vocals
Dee Barton, Bob Fitzpatrick, Newell Parker – trombone
Jim Amlotte, – bass trombone
Dave Wheeler – bass trombone, tuba
Dwight Carver, Gene Roland, Carl Saunders, Ray Starling – mellophonium
Lex de Azevedo – piano, celeste (tracks 1, 4, 6 & 10–12)
Alvino Rey – console guitar
Don Bagley – bass 
Art Anton – drums 
Lennie Niehaus – arranger, conductor (tracks 1, 4, 6 & 10–12)

References

Stan Kenton albums
1962 albums
Capitol Records albums
Albums conducted by Stan Kenton

Albums recorded at Capitol Studios
Albums produced by Lee Gillette